Elections were held on 3 May 2007 to elect 65 local councillors for Bath and North East Somerset Council. The results are show below.
Following the elections, a Conservative minority administration was formed. Cllr Francine Haeberling became leader of the council. This replaced the previous Liberal Democrat and Conservative coalition.

Election results

Ward results
The ward results listed below are based on the changes from the 2003 elections, not taking into account any party defections or by-elections. Sitting councillors are marked with an asterisk (*).

Abbey

Bathavon North

Bathavon South

Bathavon West

Bathwick

Chew Valley North

Chew Valley South

Clutton

Combe Down

Farmborough

High Littleton

Keynsham East

Keynsham North

Keynsham South

Kingsmead

Lambridge

Lansdown

Lyncombe

Mendip

Midsomer Norton North

Midsomer Norton Redfield

Newbridge

Odd Down

Oldfield

Paulton

Peasedown

Publow with Whitchurch

Radstock

Saltford

Southdown

Timsbury

Twerton

Walcot

Westfield

Westmoreland

Weston

Widcombe

By-elections between 2007 and 2011

Radstock

References
General

Specific

2007 English local elections
2007
2000s in Somerset